Franz Dumser (15 September 1903 – 18 March 1982) was an Austrian footballer. He played in two matches for the Austria national football team from 1925 to 1926.

References

External links
 
 

1903 births
1982 deaths
Austrian footballers
Austria international footballers
Footballers from Vienna
1. Simmeringer SC players
Association football midfielders
FC Admira Wacker Mödling players
Wiener Sport-Club players